Sumach is an unincorporated community in Dunklin County, in the U.S. state of Missouri.

History
A post office called Sumack was established in 1889, and remained in operation until 1896. The community was so named on account of the sumach near the original town site.

References

Unincorporated communities in Dunklin County, Missouri
Unincorporated communities in Missouri